National Tertiary Route 327, or just Route 327 (or ) is a National Road Route of Costa Rica, located in the San José province.

Description
In San José province the route covers Pérez Zeledón canton (San Pedro district).

References

Highways in Costa Rica